Dale Studzinski (born 6 August 1979 in Durban, KwaZulu-Natal) is a retired South African football striker.

References

1979 births
Living people
South African soccer players
Sportspeople from Durban
Bidvest Wits F.C. players
SuperSport United F.C. players
Association football forwards
Platinum Stars F.C. players
White South African people
Thanda Royal Zulu F.C. players
Manning Rangers F.C. players
Nathi Lions F.C. players